Disk Clean-up (cleanmgr.exe) is a computer maintenance utility included in Microsoft Windows designed to free up disk space on a computer's hard drive. It has now been deprecated and replaced with a modern version in the Settings app, although it still exists as a legacy tool in Windows.

About 
The utility searches files that are no longer of any use, and then removes the selected unnecessary files. There are a number of different file categories that Disk Clean-up targets when performing the initial disk analysis:
 Compression of old files
 Temporary Internet files
 Temporary Windows files
 Downloaded program files
 Recycle Bin
 Removal of unused applications or optional Windows components
 Setup log files
 Offline web pages (cached)
 WinSxS (Windows component store)
 
The above list, however, is not exhaustive. For instance, 'Temporary Remote Desktop files' and 'Temporary Sync Files' may appear only under certain computer configurations, differences such as Windows Operating System and use of additional programs such as Remote Desktop. The option of removing hibernation data may not be ideal for some users as this may remove the hibernate option.

In Windows 10 and 11 you can also choose an option “Clean up system files”. You will have more files to delete. One of new categories is “Windows Update Cleanup”. It allows to free up a few gigabytes of space. But notice, that if you clean this category it would be impossible to uninstall current Windows update version.

Aside from removing unnecessary files, users also have the option of compressing files that have not been accessed over a set period of time. This option provides a systematic compression scheme. Infrequently accessed files are compressed to free up disk space while leaving the frequently used files uncompressed for faster read/write access times. If after file compression, a user wishes to access a compressed file, the access times may be increased and vary from system to system.

In addition to the categories that appear on the Disk Clean-up tab, the More Options tab offers additional options for freeing up hard drive space through removal of optional Windows components, installed programs, and all but the most recent System Restore point or Shadow Copy data in some versions of Microsoft Windows.

Deprecation 
Starting with Windows 10 version 1803 (RS4), the capabilities of Disk Clean-up are incorporated into Windows 10's Settings app. The standalone Disk Cleanup tool is still included, but deprecated in favor of the new interface.

See also
 Desktop Cleanup Wizard
 Disk Space Analyzers

References

External links
 Microsoft Help and Support - Description of the Disk Cleanup Tool in Windows XP
 Creating a Disk Cleanup Handler

Windows components
Windows-only software
Utilities for Windows